The 1989–90 Liga Artzit season in Israel saw Tzafririm Holon and Hapoel Tel Aviv promoted to Liga Leumit. At the other end of the table, Hapoel Rishon LeZion and Hapoel Lod were automatically relegated to Liga Alef, whilst Maccabi Tamra went down after losing the promotion-relegation play-offs. Maccabi Yavne's Benny Tabak was the league's top scorer with 19 goals.

Final table

Promotion-relegation play-offs
14th-placed Maccabi Tamra had to play-off against Liga Alef play-off winners Ironi Ashdod:

The result meant that Tamra were relegated.

References
Israel 1989/90 RSSSF

Liga Artzit seasons
Israel
2